VA Medical Center station is a light rail station on the Blue Line on  Fort Snelling in the Twin Cities region of Minnesota.

This station is on the northwest corner of the intersection of Minnehaha Avenue with the entrance to the Minneapolis VAHCS Medical Center. A center-platform station, it entered service when the Blue Line opened on June 26, 2004.

North of the station, between it and the 50th Street/Minnehaha Park Station, the Blue Line leaves Minnesota State Highway 55 and travels down the center of Minnehaha Avenue for two blocks.

Bus connections
From the station, there are direct bus connections to routes 22, 440 and 515.

Notable places nearby
Minneapolis VAHCS Medical Center
 Minnehaha and Morris Park neighborhoods

References

External links 
Metro Transit: VA Medical Center Station

Railway stations in the United States opened in 2004
2004 establishments in Minnesota
Metro Blue Line (Minnesota) stations in Hennepin County, Minnesota